Lower Broadheath is a village and civil parish in the Malvern Hills district of Worcestershire, England.  According to the 2011 census it had a population of 1,728. The parish also includes Upper Broadheath.

The village is about 3 miles north-west of Worcester.

There are many housing estates in the village, including the Jacomb estate (Jacomb Road, Jacomb Drive, Jacomb Close and Rectory Close).

The village has a village hall, church, post office and shop, a village green (containing a football pitch, running track and many children's play areas) and a large village common. There is also a primary school (Broadheath C.E. Primary School). The school contains around 150 children, from the age of four up to eleven.  There are also two pubs in the village.

History

Broadheath is the birthplace of the English composer Edward Elgar. The cottage in which he was born is now the Elgar Birthplace Museum.

References

External links

 Lower Broadheath official web site.
 The Church (photos) at Lower Broadheath. Retrieved 23 May 2009
 The Elgar Birthplace
 Listing at the Worcester branch of the Birmingham and Midland Society for Genealogy and Heraldry website

Villages in Worcestershire
Civil parishes in Worcestershire
Malvern Hills District